Trigonostoma diamantinum is a species of sea snail, a marine gastropod mollusc in the family Cancellariidae, commonly known as the nutmeg snails.

Description

Distribution

References

 Hemmen J. (2007). Recent Cancellariidae. Wiesbaden, 428pp

Cancellariidae
Gastropods described in 1975